The 10th British Academy Video Game Awards awarded by the British Academy of Film and Television Arts, is an award ceremony that was held on 12 March 2014 at Tobacco Dock. The ceremony honoured achievement in video gaming in 2013 and was hosted by Dara Ó Briain.

Winners and nominees
The nominees for the 10th British Academy Video Games Awards were announced on 12 February 2014.

The winners were announced during the awards ceremony on 12 March 2014.

Awards

Winners are shown first in bold.

{| class=wikitable
| valign="top" width="50%" |

The Last of Us – Naughty Dog/Sony Computer Entertainment
Assassin's Creed IV: Black Flag – Ubisoft Montreal/Ubisoft
Badland – Johannes Vuorinen and Juhana Myllys, Frogmind Games/Frogmind Games
Grand Theft Auto V – Rockstar North/Rockstar Games
Lego Marvel Super Heroes – Jon Burton, Arthur Parsons and Phillip Ring, Traveller's Tales/Warner Bros. Interactive Entertainment
Tomb Raider – Crystal Dynamics/Square Enix
| valign="top" |

''Brothers: A Tale of Two Sons – Starbreeze Studios/505 GamesGrand Theft Auto V – Rockstar North/Rockstar Games
Papers, Please – Lucas Pope, 3909 LLC/3909 LLC
The Stanley Parable – Galactic Cafe/Galactic Cafe
Tearaway – Tarsier Studios and Media Molecule/Sony Computer Entertainment Europe
Year Walk – Simogo/Simogo
|-
| valign="top" width="50%" |Tearaway – Tarsier Studios and Media Molecule/Sony Computer Entertainment EuropeBeyond: Two Souls – John Rostron, David Cage and Guillaume De Fondaumiere, Quantic Dream/Sony Computer Entertainment
BioShock Infinite – Patrick Balthrop, Scott Haraldsen and James Bonney, Irrational Games/2K Games
Device 6 – Simogo/Simogo
The Last of Us – Naughty Dog/Sony Computer Entertainment
Ni no Kuni: Wrath of the White Witch – Yoshiyuki Momose, Level-5/Bandai Namco Games
| valign="top" |Tearaway – Tarsier Studios and Media Molecule/Sony Computer Entertainment EuropeBadland – Johannes Vuorinen and Juhana Myllys, Frogmind Games/Frogmind Games
Device 6 – Simogo/Simogo
Plants vs. Zombies 2: It's About Time – PopCap Games/Electronic Arts
Ridiculous Fishing – Vlambeer/Vlambeer
The Room Two – Fireproof Games
|-
| valign="top" width="50%" |The Last of Us – Naughty Dog/Sony Computer EntertainmentBattlefield 4 – EA DICE/Electronic Arts
BioShock Infinite – Patrick Balthrop, Scott Haraldsen and James Bonney, Irrational Games/2K Games
Device 6 – Simogo/Simogo
Grand Theft Auto V – Rockstar North/Rockstar Games
Tomb Raider – Crystal Dynamics/Square Enix
| valign="top" |Grand Theft Auto V – Rockstar North/Rockstar GamesWorld of Tanks – Wargaming/Wargaming
Super Mario 3D World – Nintendo EAD Tokyo and 1-Up Studio/Nintendo
The Last of Us – Naughty Dog/Sony Computer Entertainment
Dota 2 – Valve/Valve
Battlefield 4 – EA DICE/Electronic Arts
|-
| valign="top" width="50%" |The Last of Us – Naughty Dog/Sony Computer EntertainmentAssassin's Creed IV: Black Flag – Ubisoft Montreal/Ubisoft
Grand Theft Auto V – Rockstar North/Rockstar Games
Papers, Please – Lucas Pope, 3909 LLC/3909 LLC
Super Mario 3D World – Nintendo EAD Tokyo and 1-Up Studio/Nintendo
Tearaway – Tarsier Studios and Media Molecule/Sony Computer Entertainment Europe
| valign="top" |BioShock Infinite – James Bonney and Garry Schyman, Irrational Games/2K GamesTearaway – Kenneth C M Young and Brian D'Oliveira, Tarsier Studios and Media Molecule/Sony Computer Entertainment Europe
Super Mario 3D World – Mahito Yokota and Koji Kondo, Nintendo EAD Tokyo and 1-Up Studio/Nintendo
The Last of Us – Gustavo Santaolalla, Naughty Dog/Sony Computer Entertainment
Beyond: Two Souls – Lorne Balfe, Quantic Dream/Sony Computer Entertainment
Assassin's Creed IV: Black Flag – Brian Tyler and Aldo Sampaio, Ubisoft Montreal/Ubisoft
|-
| valign="top" width="50%" |Grand Theft Auto V – Rockstar North/Rockstar GamesTearaway – Tarsier Studios and Media Molecule/Sony Computer Entertainment Europe
The Room Two – Fireproof Games
Lego Marvel Super Heroes – Jon Burton, Arthur Parsons and Phillip Ring, Traveller's Tales/Warner Bros. Interactive Entertainment
Gunpoint – Tom Francis, John Roberts and Ryan Ike, Suspicious Developments/Suspicious Developments
DmC: Devil May Cry – Ninja Theory/Capcom
| valign="top" |Ashley Johnson – The Last of Us as EllieCourtnee Draper – BioShock Infinite as Elizabeth
Elliot Page – Beyond: Two Souls as Jodie
Kevan Brighting – The Stanley Parable as The Narrator
Steven Ogg – Grand Theft Auto V as Trevor Philips
Troy Baker – The Last of Us as Joel
|-
| valign="top" width="50%" |Gone Home – Fullbright/FullbrightThe Stanley Parable – Galactic Cafe/Galactic Cafe
Remember Me – Jean-Maxime Moris, Hervé Bonin and Oskar Guilbert, Dontnod Entertainment/Capcom
Gunpoint – Tom Francis, John Roberts and Ryan Ike, Suspicious Developments/Suspicious Developments
Castles in the Sky – Jack de Quidt and Dan Pearce
Badland – Johannes Vuorinen, Juhana Myllys, Frogmind Games/Frogmind Games
| valign="top" |FIFA 14 – EA Canada/EA SportsF1 2013 – Codemasters/Codemasters
NBA 2K14 – Visual Concepts/2K Sports
GRID 2 – Codemasters/Codemasters
Forza Motorsport 5 – Bill Giese, Dave Gierok and Barry Feather, Turn 10 Studios/Microsoft Studios
Football Manager 2014 – Sports Interactive/Sega
|-
| valign="top" width="50%" |Tearaway – Tarsier Studios and Media Molecule/Sony Computer Entertainment EuropeAnimal Crossing: New Leaf – Nintendo EAD/Nintendo
Super Mario 3D World – Nintendo EAD Tokyo and 1-Up Studio/Nintendo
Skylanders: Swap Force – Vicarious Visions/Activision
Rayman Legends – Michael Ancel, Christophe Heral and Jean-Christophe Alessandri, Ubisoft/Ubisoft
Brothers: A Tale of Two Sons – Starbreeze Studios/505 Games
| valign="top" |The Last of Us – Neil Druckmann and Bruce Straley, Naughty Dog/Sony Computer EntertainmentThe Stanley Parable – Galactic Cafe/Galactic Cafe
Ni no Kuni: Wrath of the White Witch – Akihiro Hino, Level-5/Bandai Namco Games
Grand Theft Auto V – Dan Houser, Rupert Humphries, Rockstar North/Rockstar Games
Gone Home – Fullbright/Fullbright
Brothers: A Tale of Two Sons – Starbreeze Studios/505 Games
|-
| valign="top" width="50%" |Grand Theft Auto V – Rockstar North/Rockstar GamesTomb Raider – Crystal Dynamics/Square Enix
Tearaway – Tarsier Studios and Media Molecule/Sony Computer Entertainment Europe
Papers, Please – Lucas Pope, 3909 LLC/3909 LLC
The Last of Us – Naughty Dog/Sony Computer Entertainment
Assassin's Creed IV: Black Flag – Ubisoft Montreal/Ubisoft
| valign="top" |Papers, Please – Lucas Pope, 3909 LLC/3909 LLCCivilization V: Brave New World – Firaxis Games/2K Games
Democracy 3 – Cliff Harris, Positech Games/Positech Games
Forza Motorsport 5 – Bill Giese, Davie Gierok and Barry Feather, Turn 10 Studios/Microsoft Studios
Surgeon Simulator 2013 – Bossa Studios/Bossa Studios
XCOM: Enemy Within – Firaxis Games/2K Games
|}

BAFTA Fellowship AwardRockstar GamesBAFTA Ones to Watch AwardSize DOES Matter'' – Mattis Delerud, Silje Dahl, Lars Anderson, Trond Fasteraune and Nick La Rooy

Games with multiple nominations and wins

Nominations

Wins

References

External links
10th BAFTA Video Games Awards page

British Academy Games Awards ceremonies
2014 awards in the United Kingdom
2013 in video gaming
March 2014 events in the United Kingdom